The Men's 10 metre air pistol pairs event took place at 7 October 2010 at the CRPF Campus.

Results

External links
Report

Shooting at the 2010 Commonwealth Games